William H. Blyton (October 4, 1842 – November 8, 1932) was an American businessman and politician.

Born in Franklinville, New York, Blyton moved to Sparta, Wisconsin in 1854. During the American Civil War, Blyton served in the 19th Wisconsin Volunteer Infantry Regiment and was quartermaster. Blyton was an insurance agent and served as village and city clerk for Sparta, Wisconsin. In 1883, 1885, and 1889, Blyton served in the Wisconsin State Assembly and was a Republican. Blyton died in Sparta, Wisconsin.

Notes

1842 births
1932 deaths
People from Franklinville, New York
People from Sparta, Wisconsin
People of Wisconsin in the American Civil War
Businesspeople from Wisconsin
Republican Party members of the Wisconsin State Assembly